Roškovce is a village and municipality in the Medzilaborce District in the Prešov Region of far north-eastern Slovakia.

History
In historical records the village was first mentioned in 1478.

Geography
The municipality lies at an altitude of 339 metres and covers an area of 12.548 km2. It has a population of about 215 people.

References

External links
 
 
https://web.archive.org/web/20071116010355/http://www.statistics.sk/mosmis/eng/run.html

Villages and municipalities in Medzilaborce District